Bad Aur Badnam is a 1984 Indian Hindi-language film directed by Feroze Chinoy for producer K. D. Shorey who has also written the story, starring Sanjeev Kumar, Shatrughan Sinha, Parveen Babi, Anita Raj and the music was composed by Laxmikant-Pyarelal.

Plot

Cast
Sanjeev Kumar as James Carlo
Shatrughan Sinha as Ashwini Kumar
Parveen Babi
Anita Raj as Dr. Anita Mathur
I. S. Johar as Malpani
Kader Khan
Jagdeep as Mishra
Raj Mehra as Mahendra Pratap "M. P."
Shreeram Lagoo
Pinchoo Kapoor

Music
All songs are written by Anand Bakshi.

External links
 

1984 films
1980s Hindi-language films
1984 action thriller films
Indian action thriller films
Films scored by Laxmikant–Pyarelal